Haughton is a civil parish in Cheshire East, England. It contains ten buildings that are recorded in the National Heritage List for England as designated listed buildings, all of which are at Grade II. This grade is the lowest of the three gradings given to listed buildings and is applied to "buildings of national importance and special interest". Apart from the village of Haughton, the parish is entirely rural. The listed buildings consist of houses and farms, and structures associated with them, and a public house. Four of the buildings date from the 17th century, and contain timber framing.

See also

Listed buildings in Brindley
Listed buildings in Bunbury
Listed buildings in Hurleston
Listed buildings in Spurstow
Listed buildings in Stoke
Listed buildings in Wardle

References
Citations

Sources

 

Listed buildings in the Borough of Cheshire East
Lists of listed buildings in Cheshire